Sansum Narrows is a strait or channel between Vancouver Island (W) and Saltspring Island (E) in the Southern Gulf Islands region of British Columbia, Canada. The narrows are between Maple Bay and Tl’ulpalus.

The powerline HVDC Vancouver-Island crosses Sansum Narrows in a 1900 metres long span, connecting Salt Spring Island to Vancouver Island's electric power.

See also
Cowichan Bay
Trincomali Channel

References

Landforms of the Gulf Islands
Straits of British Columbia
Southern Vancouver Island